Baron Clanmorris, of Newbrook in the County of Mayo, is a title in the Peerage of Ireland. It was created on 6 August 1800 for John Bingham. He was a descendant of John Bingham of Foxford in County Mayo, whose brother Sir Henry Bingham, 1st Baronet, of Castlebar, was the ancestor of the Earls of Lucan. The first Baron's great-great-great-grandson, the seventh Baron, was a spy and crime novelist (as John Bingham).  the title is held by the latter's son, the eighth Baron, who succeeded in 1988.

The Hon. Edward Bingham, a younger son of the fifth Baron won the Victoria Cross for his actions during the battle of Jutland. The novelist Charlotte Bingham is the daughter of the seventh and the sister of the eighth Baron Clanmorris. A granddaughter of the fourth Baron was Zara Pollock, who married Alexander Hore-Ruthven who, as 1st Baron Gowrie, was Governor-General of Australia 1936–44.

Barons Clanmorris (1800)

John Bingham, 1st Baron Clanmorris (1762–1821)
Charles Barry Bingham, 2nd Baron Clanmorris (1796–1829)
Denis Arthur Bingham, 3rd Baron Clanmorris (1808–1847)
John Charles Robert Bingham, 4th Baron Clanmorris (1826–1876)
John George Barry Bingham, 5th Baron Clanmorris (1852–1916)
Arthur Maurice Robert Bingham, 6th Baron Clanmorris (1879–1960)
John Michael Ward Bingham, 7th Baron Clanmorris (1908–1988)
Simon John Ward Bingham, 8th Baron Clanmorris (born 1937)

The heir presumptive and sole heir to the peerage is the present holder's second cousin Robert Derek de Burgh Bingham (born 1942).

See also
Earl of Lucan

Notes

References 

Kidd, Charles, Williamson, David (editors). Debrett's Peerage and Baronetage (1990 edition). New York: St Martin's Press, 1990, 

Baronies in the Peerage of Ireland
Noble titles created in 1800